The Balranald Football Club are an Australian football club competing in the Central Murray Football League.  The club is based in the town of Balranald in the Riverina region of New South Wales.  The club was founded in 1887 and their home ground is called Greenham Park.

An early report of a match between the Balranald Football Club and the Mechanics Institute occurred in 1887. The club, because of its isolation spend a lot of time playing scratch matches amongst themselves. As was the nature of the time the club secretary would write to other clubs in a bid to organise a game of football.

After reforming after the WW2, the club played invitational games against towns outside its district. This continued until 1950 when it entered the Northern Murray Valley Football League that included 3 clubs around Robinvale. Improvement of the road system allowed the club to travel further and safer to other towns.

In 1955 the club was admitted into the Mid Murray FL. In its second year it made the finals and two years later the club won its first final.

Premierships 
 Balranald-Moulamein Football Association
 1924, 1925
 Kyalite Football Association
 1930
 Northern Murray Valley FL
 1954
 Mid Murray FL
 1989, 1990, 1994
 Central Murray FL
 2006 and 2009

VFL/AFL Players

Former VFL players that had played for the club include
 Jim Jess - 
 Mark Lee - 
 Ron Andrews - , 
 Jeff Fehring - , 
 David Simpson - 
 Peter Laughlin - 
 Merv Neagle - ,

Further reading
 Balranald Football Club Information

References

Australian rules football clubs established in 1949
Sports clubs established in 1949
1949 establishments in Australia
Netball teams in New South Wales
Central Murray Football League
Australian rules football clubs in New South Wales